Somwarpet Vittalacharya Sunil (born 6 May 1989) is an Indian professional field hockey player who plays for the Indian national team. He represented India during the 2012 London Olympics and won silver with them at the 2014 Commonwealth Games. He received the Arjun Award in 2017.

Early life
Sunil was born on 6 May 1989 to Vittalacharya and Shanta in the Kodagu district of Karnataka, is a Vishwakarma Brahmin and is an ethnic Kannadiga. At the age of four, he lost his mother. His father worked as a carpenter and his brother, a goldsmith. Born into a poor family, Sunil used bamboo for a hockey stick during his younger days.

Career
Sunil took up hockey when he was 14 and trained at the Boys' Sports Company in Bangalore. In 2005, he was drafted into the Indian Army Service Corps as a havildar, where he shone as a player in the inter-services league. In 2007, he was signed by Chennai Veerans to play in the inaugural edition of the Premier Hockey League. The following season, he played for Bangalore Hi-Fliers.

Sunil made his senior international debut in 2007 during the Asia Cup in Chennai, a tournament that India went on to win. His first scoring game was against Sri Lanka in which he scored a hat-trick. India defeated South Korea in the final of the tournament by a 7–2 margin, with Sunil scoring the second goal for his team. In the 2008 edition of the Sultan Azlan Shah Cup, Sunil scored his only goal against Belgium. India went to on to lose to Argentina in the final. Sunil traveled with the team for the tournament's next edition to Malaysia. However, news of his father's death reached him a few hours before India's opening match against Egypt. Sunil went on to play the match, despite being asked by coach Harendra Singh to return home. He later remarked later that he was inspired by cricketer Sachin Tendulkar who played under similar circumstances.

Having played through a right knee injury meant Sunil had to pull out of three major events of 2010: the World Cup, Commonwealth Games and the Asian Games. He returned to the squad after a surgery, and trained to ensure that he was "faster than ever before". He was a member of the squad that won gold at the inaugural edition of the Asian Champions Trophy in 2011. He scored four goals in the Champions Challenge I later that year and was the most by an India forward. He had a successful outing in the qualifying round for the 2012 London Olympics but a poor finals with his team finishing last. He won bronze with India in the Sultan Azlan Shah Cup a few prior scoring two goals in the tournament. His first goal, the winner, came against Pakistan in the 69th minute in a 2–1 victory. He was included in Azlan Shah XI, the team of the tournament.

Hockey India League
In the auction of the Hockey India League in 2013, Sunil was bought by the Punjab franchise for USD42,000 with his base price being US$13,900. The Punjab team was named Punjab Warriors. The team won in the 2016 season defeating Kalinga Lancers 6–1 in the final.

2014–present 
Sunil represented India at the 2014 Commonwealth Games, where India won the silver medal. He was a regular member of the India squad until he was first dropped for his team's Argentina leg of the 2020–21 season of Pro League. He was again left out of the squad named for the 2020 Tokyo Olympics. He subsequently announced retirement from the national team in October 2021. However, he came back from retirement a few months later and was included in India 'A' core probables, picked up to train a developmental group for the senior national team. He was named in the squad for the 2022 Asia Cup and was appointed vice-captain; India fielded its 'A' team for the competition.

References

External links
 
 S. V. Sunil at Hockey India

1989 births
Living people
Field hockey players at the 2012 Summer Olympics
Field hockey players at the 2016 Summer Olympics
Olympic field hockey players of India
People from Kodagu district
Field hockey players at the 2014 Commonwealth Games
Field hockey players at the 2018 Commonwealth Games
Asian Games medalists in field hockey
Field hockey players at the 2014 Asian Games
Field hockey players from Karnataka
Indian male field hockey players
Asian Games gold medalists for India
Commonwealth Games silver medallists for India
Commonwealth Games medallists in field hockey
Medalists at the 2014 Asian Games
Male field hockey defenders
Hockey India League players
Field hockey players at the 2018 Asian Games
Asian Games bronze medalists for India
Medalists at the 2018 Asian Games
Recipients of the Rajyotsava Award 2016
Recipients of the Arjuna Award
2014 Men's Hockey World Cup players
Medallists at the 2014 Commonwealth Games